Jackie Kay Banta (June 24, 1925 – September 17, 2006) was an American right-handed pitcher in Major League Baseball who played for the Brooklyn Dodgers from 1947 to 1950.

Banta won the game which clinched the 1949 National League pennant for the Dodgers, and made three appearances in relief in the 1949 World Series against the New York Yankees.

External links

1925 births
2006 deaths
Brooklyn Dodgers players
Major League Baseball pitchers
Baseball players from Kansas
Sportspeople from Hutchinson, Kansas
Minor league baseball managers
Montreal Royals players
Newport News Dodgers players
Olean Oilers players
St. Paul Saints (AA) players
Fort Worth Cats players
Lancaster Red Roses players